The two locomotives comprising the South Australian Railways J class were the only steam locomotives with a 0-6-0 wheel arrangement ever operated by the railway. They went into service in August 1875 and were condemned more than five decades later, in 1932 and 1934.

Irish origins
Both of the locomotives were built in 1872 by Beyer, Peacock & Co. Ltd at their Gorton Foundry near Manchester for the Irish companies Dublin and Belfast Junction Railway and Dublin and Drogheda Railway, which were cutting back on purchases. There were few other   broad-gauge railways in existence at the time, and they were offered for sale to the South Australian Government.

Deployment
The locomotives were about 25 per cent more powerful than any on the South Australian Railways at the time, so they were put to immediate use hauling copper trains and wheat trains on the Port Adelaide to Kapunda route. Early on, they were also well deployed hauling heavy goods trains over the fairly level Adelaide–Port Adelaide route. The six-wheel rigid wheelbase, with no leading or trailing truck to minimise yawing, did not make the locomotives suitable for the tightly curved and steeply graded line through the Adelaide hills, even though their large (5 ft 0 in) diameter wheels were characteristic of passenger locomotives of the time. 

When copper ore traffic came to an end, the two locomotives were deployed on the main northern line to Terowie which, by then, had opened to Terowie, the break-of-gauge station on the southern boundary of the narrow-gauge Northern Division.

By 1888, both locomotives were relegated to shunting duties because they were in dire need of major overhauls, which followed two years later.

When the Murraylands lines opened early in the 1900s, one J class locomotive was stationed at the Murray Bridge, from where it operated on the new lines. Although these lightly engineered lines had undulating gradients through sandy mallee country, most curves were broad, allowing the 0-6-0s to traverse them quite easily.

The two locomotives' last long-distance duties were working cattle trains over the Terowie line, after which they were relegated to shunting duties around Adelaide. Following the introduction of Commissioner William Webb's "big power" locomotives, they were taken out of service and condemned in 1929 and 1932, as were many of their ancient contemporaries. They were scrapped respectively in 1929 and 1934.

Modifications

As introduced, the locomotives were typical Beyer, Peacock products, with features that included highly polished brass steam domes. Large cutaways on the sides of the cab, and a roof that covered only a small area, provided little protection for the crew. A small oil or kerosene lamp was placed on the front top of the smokebox; electric headlights were never fitted. Later, marker lamps were placed on the front running board to identify the destination at night.

One of the first alterations was the addition of a bar-frame "cowcatcher", which remained until the locomotives were assigned to shunting in the metropolitan area: since they protruded well past the front buffers, they were particularly dangerous for railwaymen coupling the locomotive to wagons.

The locomotives' first significant rebuild was undertaken in 1890 and 1891. The cabs were slightly altered, extending the roof a little to provide more shelter to the crew; boilers and were safety valves were also replaced. About ten years later, their vacuum brakes were replaced by Westinghouse air brakes and better cabs, similar to those of the F, S and T classes, were installed. The new cab sides were solid, with small rectangular window openings, providing more protection than the large cutaways. New roofs, extending back nearly to the  tender, at last provided adequate protection from rain and the harsh South Australian summer sun, especially for the fireman when shovelling coal from tender to firebox.

By the time of their withdrawal in 1929 and 1932 after 57 and 60 years' service respectively, locomotives number 32 and 33 – like all of the Beyer, Peacock locomotives of the South Australian Railways – had well and truly paid for themselves.

Notes

References

Beyer, Peacock locomotives
Railway locomotives introduced in 1875
J
0-6-0 locomotives
Broad gauge locomotives in Australia